Unison Home Ownership Investors (commonly known as Unison) is a home ownership investment company based in San Francisco, California.

History 
Current company chairman Thomas Sponholtz founded the company that is now known as Unison in 2004, but the company did not start becoming involved in home ownership investment until 2007.

Sponholtz founded Unison as a way to connect institutional investors to local real estate agents and home buyers who didn't have the capital required to purchase a home and didn't want to take out loans, make monthly payments, or incur debt. Jim Riccitelli joined Unison as co-CEO several years later and served as head of the company's customer education program. From 2017 to 2019,  Riccitelli assumed the role of president, and would focus on consumer education and financial literacy.

In May 2013 the company announced it would provide down payment funding in combination with the portfolio loans of HomeStreet Bank.

On September 19, 2013, the company announced that it would be launching its down payment funding in combination with RPM Mortgage loans in California.

On July 11, 2016, the company announced that it would be launching its down payment funding in combination with Guild Mortgage loans in Washington. On August 1, 2016, they announced that they expanded the availability to consumers in Oregon and California.

On August 8, 2016, the company announced it would offer its down payment funding with California Mortgage Company (First Cal) on single-family homes, condos and townhomes in combination with conventional loans meeting conforming and super-conforming guidelines.

On December 5, 2016, FirstREX changed its name to Unison Home Ownership Investors.

On February 1, 2017, the company was featured in HousingWire, highlighting additional states of operation.

On February 21, 2017, then Prosper Marketplace President Ron Suber joined the company as an investor and strategic advisor.

On February 22, 2017, the company announced over 300 million in total capital raised.

On May 16, 2017, the company announced findings from the "Unison Home Affordability Report 2017," showcasing the percentage of homes accessible to the median household in major U.S. cities.

On September 19, 2017, the company released findings from its survey of 2,018 Americans, conducted by Atomik Research, on the biggest barriers to home ownership.

On November 13, 2017, the company announced multiple promotions and additions to its management team.

On November 15, 2017, Unison Investment Management, the asset management arm of Unison Home Ownership Investors, released findings from a report which analyzed the current measurement of inflation and the effect on real estate investments in the United States.

On February 26, 2018, the company and Valley National Bank, the wholly owned subsidiary of Valley National Bancorp, announced the launch of their 5% down payment program which will be given in conjunction with an 80% loan-to-value mortgage.

On April 4, 2018, the company released its second annual Home Affordability Report, a comprehensive breakdown of housing affordability in 22 of the largest metro areas across the United States. The report found inequality in housing affordability, not only from city to city but also within cities from one neighborhood to another.

On June 1, 2018, The New York Times wrote an article about shared equity programs that called attention to Unison, Landed, and Own Home Finance.

On June 26, 2018, announced that it had closed a $40 Million Series B Funding Round.

Awards and recognition 

The company was featured on Bank Innovation's list of "2017 Innovators to Watch".

The company was featured in GoBankingRates "10 Startups to Watch in 2018".

In 2019, Unison was named to Deloitte's Fast500 as one of the fastest-growing companies in North America, ranking third in the Bay Area and nineteenth overall.

Model 
The Down Payment Resource HPI currently tracks 33 shared equity programs. Most are city/county, non-profit or university administered programs. There are also new programs in high cost markets, like the San Francisco Bay area, designed by private investors to help buyers finance homes that are outside conventional home price limits.

The Urban Institute evaluated shared equity programs and found they are successful in linking low- and moderate-income people with affordable owner-occupied housing. In addition, home ownership among shared equity programs is sustainable, and shared equity homeowners resell their homes with the same frequency and for the same reasons as other homeowners.

The company's basic business model differs from the traditional financing in that the consumer does not incur debt because there is no monthly payment or interest accrued. Rather, a home ownership              investment  is a shared piece of capital between the investor and the homeowner. A home ownership investment is financing based on partnership and shared incentives between the homeowner and the investor. In a home ownership investment, an investor provides financing in exchange for the opportunity to share in the gain or loss in the home's value when the homeowner decides to sell their home. There are no interest charges or monthly payments on the financing provided.

The company operates two programs, Unison HomeBuyer and Unison HomeOwner.

The first, HomeBuyer, works in combination with a traditional mortgage, providing 5% to 15% of a 20% down payment, while the HomeOwner program is geared toward current homeowners looking to tap into their home equity. Both programs remain interest-free without monthly payments for 30 years.

The company, in return, shares 35 percent of the appreciation in the home either when it is sold, after 30 years, or when the borrower decides to pay back the investment. Conversely, if the home depreciates, the company shares in 35 percent of the loss. There is a minimum of 3 years required in order to realize the property appreciation.

The company's programs look to connect pension funds and institutional investors and their private risk capital with the growing number of retiring baby boomers with inadequate savings, college graduates with student loan debt, first time home buyers, and Millennials.

In 2017 the average homebuyer under 35 spent 8% on a down payment. the company's business model involves splitting a 20% down payment with homebuyers.

Unison has relationships with Guaranteed Rate, HomeBridge Financial Services, Guild Mortgage, Valley Bank, Goldwater Bank, HomeStreet Bank, PRMG, Supreme Lending, LendUS and others.

Unison programs are currently available in 30 states including Arizona, California, Connecticut, Oregon, Washington, Illinois, Massachusetts, Maryland, New Jersey, New York, Pennsylvania, Virginia, Florida, Georgia, Ohio, Michigan, Minnesota, Nevada, Colorado, North Carolina, Missouri, Delaware, Indiana, Kansas, Kentucky, New Mexico, South Carolina, Tennessee, Utah, Wisconsin and Washington, DC.

References

External links 
 Official website

Real estate in the United States
Mortgage lenders of the United States
Companies based in San Francisco